The Per Wendel Award (Per Wendel-priset)  is a Swedish award given to a journalist  by the newspaper Expressen. The award money sum is 75,000 (SEK). The award is given annually in the memory of Swedish journalist Per Wendel (1947-2005) who worked for Expressen from 1973 primarily as a domestic policy reporter.

Awardees
2006: Fredrik Sjöshult
2007: Jan Mosander
2008: Anna Jaktén
2009: Christian Holmén and Micke Ölander
2010: Janne Josefsson
2011: Anette Holmqvist
2012: Hannes Råstam
2013: Mats-Eric Nilsson 
2014: Carolina Neurath

References

Swedish awards
Journalism awards